In algebraic geometry, a group-stack is an algebraic stack whose categories of points have group structures or even groupoid structures in a compatible way. It generalizes a group scheme, which is a scheme whose sets of points have group structures in a compatible way.

Examples 
A group scheme is a group-stack. More generally, a group algebraic-space, an algebraic-space analog of a group scheme, is a group-stack.
Over a field k, a vector bundle stack  on a Deligne–Mumford stack X is a group-stack such that there is a vector bundle V over k on X and a presentation . It has an action by the affine line  corresponding to scalar multiplication.
A Picard stack is an example of a group-stack (or groupoid-stack).

Actions of group-stacks 
The definition of a group action of a group-stack is a bit tricky. First, given an algebraic stack X and a group scheme G on a base scheme S, a right action of G on X consists of
 a morphism ,
 (associativity) a natural isomorphism , where m is the multiplication on G,
 (identity) a natural isomorphism , where  is the identity section of G,
that satisfy the typical compatibility conditions.

If, more generally, G is a group-stack, one then extends the above using local presentations.

Notes

References 

Algebraic geometry